was a 3,860-seat theater located in Asakusa, Taitō, Tokyo, Japan, which was used for concerts and theatrical performances. It opened in 1937 and was closed in 1982. It was demolished and replaced by the Asakusa View Hotel in 1985. The SKD often appeared in a double bill with a film. Other artists that performed at the theater include King Crimson and Whitesnake.

References

Music venues in Tokyo
Former theatres in Japan
Cinemas in Tokyo
Theatres in Tokyo
Buildings and structures demolished in 1982
Demolished buildings and structures in Japan
Former cinemas
Theatres completed in 1937
1937 establishments in Japan
1982 disestablishments in Japan
Asakusa
Buildings and structures in Taitō